Antheraea yamamai, the Japanese silk moth or Japanese oak silkmoth (Japanese:  or ) is a moth of the family Saturniidae. It is endemic to east Asia, but has been imported to Europe for tussar silk production and is now found in southeastern Europe, mainly in Austria, northeastern Italy, and the Balkans. It seems to be spreading north and a population has been reported near Deggendorf and Passau in Germany. The species was first described by Félix Édouard Guérin-Méneville in 1861. It has been hybridized artificially with Antheraea polyphemus of North America.

This moth has been cultivated in Japan for more than 1000 years. It produces a naturally white silk that is very strong and elastic, but does not dye well. It is now very rare and expensive.

Adults are on wing from August to September in one generation depending on the location.

The larva mainly feed on Quercus species, but have also been reported on Fagus sylvatica, Castanea sativa, Carpinus, Rosa, and Crataegus.

In order to look at the tensan silk genes in more detail a de novo genome and set of transcriptomes have been sequenced, producing a 700Mb reference with 15,481 genes.

Subspecies
Antheraea yamamai yamamai
Antheraea yamamai bergmani Bryk, 1949
Antheraea yamamai titan Mell, 1958
Antheraea yamamai ussuriensis Schachbazov, 1953
Antheraea yamamai superba Inoue, 1964 (Taiwan)

References

External links
Taxonomy Fauna Europaea
Lepiforum e.V.
Saturniidae of the Western Palaearctic

yamamai
Moths of Asia
Moths of Europe
Moths described in 1861
Sericulture